The Guardian of Zion Award is an annual award given since 1997 to individuals who have been supportive of the State of Israel. It is awarded at the Ingeborg Rennert Center for Jerusalem Studies at Bar-Ilan University, where the prize recipient gives the keynote address.

References

Awards established in 1997
Bar-Ilan University